A Version of Now is the first solo studio album by Australian rock musician Peter Garrett, which was released in July 2016 on Sony Music Entertainment Australia. The album follows Garrett's retirement from Australian politics at the 2013 federal election.

Track listing

Charts

References

2016 debut albums
Sony Records albums
Peter Garrett albums